Histoire d'un fait divers (1946) is a novel by the French author Jean-Jacques Gautier, winning the Prix Goncourt in 1946.

The novel receives the Goncourt prize, the first for the publishing house Julliard.

References 

1946 French novels
Prix Goncourt winning works